The Aetherius Society is a new religious movement founded by George King in the mid-1950s as the result of what King claimed were contacts with extraterrestrial intelligences, to whom he referred as "Cosmic Masters". The main goal of the believer is to cooperate with these Cosmic Masters to help humanity solve its current Earthly problems and advance into the New Age.
 
It is a syncretic religion, based primarily on theosophy and incorporating millenarian, New Age, and UFO religion aspects.
Emphases of the religion include altruism, community service, nature worship, spiritual healing and physical exercise. Members meet in congregations like those of churches. John A. Saliba states that, unlike many other New Age or UFO religions, the Aetherius Society is for the most part considered uncontroversial, although its esoteric and millenarian aspects are sometimes ridiculed. The religion may be considered to have a relatively conventional praxis, attracting members from mainstream society. The society's membership, although international, is relatively small. David V. Barrett suggested in 2011 that the worldwide membership was in the thousands, with the largest numbers in the United Kingdom, United States (particularly Southern California) and New Zealand.

Overview
The theology of the Aetherius Society is regarded as firmly based in theosophy, the Aetherius Society combines UFO claims, yoga, and ideas from various world religions, notably Hinduism, Buddhism, and Christianity. The society asserts itself as a plural or liberal religion, stating "nor does God favor people of one religion over another – and certainly not people of one country or race over another". Stefan Isaksson notes that it has "become a complex religious belief system that includes an extraterrestrial hierarchy of various spiritual masters and such concepts as universal karma and religious healing."  The religion's goal is to prevent worldly destruction by improving cooperation between humanity and various alien 'masters', and by using 'spiritual energy' to improve the spiritual calibre of the world. The society has claimed that various disasters may be prevented or relieved by prayer, often aided by "Spiritual Energy Batteries" meant to store healing psychic energy  The society also believes that it is to prepare the way for the "Next Master," a messianic figure who will descend upon Earth in a flying saucer, possessing "magic" more powerful than all the world's armies.  The society is named after Aetherius, a being King claims to have telepathically contacted and channelled. Aetherius is believed to be a Cosmic Master from Venus, as are Buddha and Jesus.

History 
George King was born on 23 January 1919, in Wellington, Shropshire, England and brought up in a Protestant family with strong occult interests.  Before founding the Aetherius Society, King had been deeply involved in spiritual healing and had joined various theosophically-based metaphysical groups in London that were a marginal part of the religious scene.  In 1944, he took up yoga, allegedly mastering bhakti, gnani and kundalini yogas and attaining the state of "Samadhi" and, according to the Aetherius Society, developed psychic powers that allowed him to learn many of the secrets of the universe.

King claimed that in 1954, a voice told him "Prepare yourself!  You are to become the voice of Interplanetary Parliament."  A week later, an unnamed but supposedly world-famous swami was reported to have entered King's locked apartment. King claims that the swami instructed him to form a group dedicated to helping the planet and that the swami further taught him yoga, prayer, and meditation. According to King, this training enabled him to receive telepathic messages from Venus, the first coming from Aetherius. King rented space in Caxton Hall in London, in which he allegedly channeled Cosmic Masters and recorded their messages.  Based on his experiences and these messages, King founded the Aetherius Society. It appears that immediately prior to founding the Society, King was earning his living as a London taxi driver.

This version of events, however, is based solely on the Aetherius Society's hagiography, and not on external sources.  Mikael Rothstein notes that a lack of objective, factual information is often a problem in studying religious leaders, even for new religious movements.  The story of King, according to Rothstein, is part of an attempt (common to all religions) to portray their founder as an extraordinary individual to legitimize the religion.

According to the Aetherius Society, George King died in Santa Barbara, California, on July 12, 1997, at the age of 78. His death was not reported in major newspapers.

Belief and activities 

In Aetherius Society teachings, various religious figures come from different planets, and throughout history Cosmic Masters such as Buddha, Jesus and Lao Tzu have come to Earth to teach mankind the right way of living.  They are regarded by the society as Avatars. Krishna, for example, is from Saturn, which is the home of a "Cosmic Hierarchy" or "Interplanetary Council", while Jesus and Buddha are from Venus. The society therefore claims that these religions sprang from the same source and their principles were identical. These beings are, however, spiritual beings on another dimension or plane, as the idea of corporeal intelligent life on the other planets was known to be unlikely in the 1950s. The society's concept is that these beings exist on a 'spiritual level' by maintaining a 'higher vibratory rate' which can be lowered, and this explains the reported blinking in and out of UFOs. The society also refers to the vimanas found in Vedic and Hindu texts, and to the Star of Bethlehem, as UFOs and examples of peaceful aliens that have been visiting to teach humanity throughout history.

King taught a belief in reincarnation based on the "Law of Karma" according to which humanity progresses life by life towards the goal of perfection. Everyone is destined eventually to become a Master and to continue evolving from there. The society claims that evolution also includes planet Earth, which is regarded as a living entity at a much higher state of evolution and importance than its inhabitants. They allege that because of the backward evolution of humans, the Earth has been under frequent attacks from evil forces from other parts of the universe and that the Cosmic Masters of other planets are fighting off a number of evil alien invaders. In Aetherius Society literature, the cosmic battles with evil forces or intelligence "bear some resemblance to the fundamentalist Christian concept of 'spiritual warfare', shorn of its imminent apocalyptic content."

As in other New Age religions, alternative medicine, spiritual healing, yoga, and dowsing are also accepted and practised by the Aetherius Society. It has also launched initiatives against pollution and nuclear power, and generally identifies with the ideals of the Green Movement. However, the society believes that environmental and societal problems are only symptoms of a much larger spiritual problem that, once solved, would cure all other problems. This is the 'spiritual energy crisis'. King designed many items of equipment intended to contain and redirect 'spiritual energy' for such purposes.

Probably the best known of these is the "Spiritual Energy Battery".  Its precise design and composition are not in the public domain. Its purpose is to hold a 'charge of spiritual energy for an indefinite period'. When connected to a "Spiritual Energy Radiator" (again designed by King), it can be 'discharged'. 'Spiritual workers' pray, chant mantras, and 'focus the energy' into the battery where it is 'stored'. The society's belief is that in times of crisis the energy can be released in a concentrated form and manipulated by cooperating Masters to the area in need. King named this activity "Operation Prayer Power". The Aetherius Society claims that under the guidance of the Cosmic Masters and with the aid of Spiritual Energy Batteries, they have prevented wars, and relieved the effects of natural disasters. King taught that these spiritual exercises help to prevent worldly destruction.

To help with this, the Aetherius Society regularly engages in "Spiritual Pushes" in which they pray and meditate to draw Prana to Earth from an orbiting spaceship known as "Satellite Number Three" which increases the amount of spiritual energy available. They claim that this satellite is shielded from telescopes and radar. In "Operation Starlight", between the years 1958 and 1961, King and various members climbed eighteen mountains throughout the world, so that the mountains could be 'spiritually charged' by the Cosmic Masters using King as the link. Members often make pilgrimages to these mountains where they have painted the movement's symbol, believing they receive more power than they can send out to the world through prayer. They believe that service to mankind is the most essential yoga or religion in the modern day.

King is now regarded by the Aetherius Society as an Avatar and Cosmic Master, though he did not make any claim to being either in his lifetime. The Aetherius Society also believes that King was the only person in the society to receive mental transmissions.

Eschatology 
King claimed to have been contacted by many aliens, including Venusians, Martians, Devas, and the Great White Brotherhood to spread a message to aid humanity.  This message exalted the promising future humanity has should Earthlings turn to better ways of living, while warning of the possible consequences otherwise. King taught that humans had the choice of self-destruction or the enjoyment of a New Age that was coming to Earth. He also taught that the Cosmic Masters had intervened via the Aetherius Society to help humanity into the New Age.

As Zeller notes in his chapter "Apocalyptic Thought in UFO Religions," King believed there would not be a catastrophic end to the world, but that the planet was on the verge of a new millennium of peace and enlightenment and the Age of Aquarius; King believe that this would also require human effort. The Aetherius Society's teachings share the individualism of not only other New Age teachings of the era, but of the Protestantism King grew up in, i.e. individual humans face the decision of whether to join the millennial kingdom.

The society also predicts the coming of 'the next Master' from space at an indefinite time, which is said to depend on the advancement of humans and the balance of karma. It is claimed he will arrive in a spacecraft with great power, and present his credentials to the leaders of Earth. Those who engage in war or ignore the 'Divine Law', will be removed from the Earth and reborn upon another planet where they will continue their progress. Those who understand the law will be left on Earth to enjoy the new millennium.

Zeller also compares King's call to correct living (with threats of suffering otherwise) to many forms of Christian apocalypticism, with King's claimed mental transmissions replacing the Bible as the standard for what that moral living is. The Aetherius Society's eschatology is millenarian and, like Christian apocalypticism and Manichaeism, features a strong moral dualism in that the society seeks to follow the positive forces of the white magicians, rejecting the opposing evil forces.

King claimed that Aetherius enabled him "to speak all terrestrial languages"—although he seemed unable to respond when asked questions in Norwegian and French.

The Silence Group 
The Society claims that the 'Space Beings' have contacted the leading Governments of the world in many ways but a rather sinister group of individuals called 'The Silence Group' (a pseudonym coined by UFO researcher Major Donald E. Keyhoe) have been deliberately suppressing this information so as to keep people uninformed, or misinformed, as to their true nature. According to King, the Silence Group uses fear and ignorance to control humanity.

Theology 
The Aetherius Society's theology is theosophical and is also based on the continual evolution of all beings back to the source which is God. The society also refers to God as being "All in All, and All in All That," and the highest aspect of God as "The Absolute." The society believes that other beings exist that are so evolved compared to humanity that they are sometimes referred to as 'Gods' to distinguish them. "There is nothing but God in the cosmos, in varying stages of evolution. Everyone will eventually become a Master and will continue evolving from there." The society regards itself as a spiritual path rather than a religious movement per se. Its path contains various stages of spiritual evolution from earthly to cosmic. Karma and reincarnation are accepted by the religion as laws of nature.  The society claims it is "not out to change existing religions so much as to add a cosmic dimension to them". Its religious services use both Christian prayers and Eastern mantras.

Criticism
Many of King's claims, particularly claims to various titles and honors, have been shown to be questionable at best.

Simon Smith states that the Aetherius Society has to bridge a number of credibility gaps exacerbated by scientific and technological advances, and mentions some seemingly insurmountable problems facing its world view, such as the non-existence of life on the other planets of the Solar System, and scarce evidence of spacecraft visiting Earth. The society uses the concepts of 'higher spheres of existence' to explain life on the other planets, and the 'lowly karmic position' of mankind to explain why extraterrestrials do not land openly. Hence the movement, while failing to keep pace with science and technology, has tried to explain consequent incompatibilities. However, explanation has become increasingly unnecessary for adherents due to their growing acceptance of King's charismatic authority.

Rothstein notes that while the Aetherius Society touts a television appearance of King's as a momentous event, contemporary media coverage of King was mostly negative.

In 1958, the society's publication "Cosmic Voice" claimed to give details transmitted by the Cosmic Masters of an atomic accident in Russia, i.e. the Kyshtym Disaster, that was not known about in the West until 1976 when revealed by the New Scientist magazine. The magazine, after receiving a claim about the transmission from the Aetherius Society, entered a two-paragraph item under the title "Scooped by a UFO!", next to other news items intended to be humorous, such as a report of a "Dolphin Embassy." The Aetherius Society, however, interprets the New Scientist coverage as recognition of King's integrity, and admission by the magazine that they had been scooped by a UFO. The Cosmic Voice reported, early in its history, that King's mother was often a passenger in the flying saucers from various planets, was once in a Martian spaceship when she was introduced to a Venusian whom she recognized as "our dear Jesus", who solemnly declared of one of George King's books, "this book is now and forever will be – Holy."

George King's titles

King is referred to by the society "as an author, inventor, metaphysician, occultist, prophet, psychic, spiritual healer, spiritual leader, teacher, yogi and Aquarian master". He was also lavished with innumerable titles, degrees, and honors from unorthodox sources. According to the society, the various honors were all given to King as a "token offer of gratitude" for his work. Rothstein observes that all of this hagiographical material is primarily aimed at believers who have special, 'esoteric' knowledge about King, whereas the society's communications during publicity campaigns are angled differently.

Accordingly, many of King's titles and awards stem from obscure sources. Barrett notes that amongst King's titles are listed a Knighthood in the Sovereign Military Orthodox Dynastic Imperial Constantinian Order of Saint Georges, which was from the Byzantine Royal House in exile, and was not recognized by the College of Arms in England, as the title "Sir" might imply. King received other chivalric titles and various degrees. Barrett states that neither the chivalric titles nor the degrees were recognized by any mainstream bodies.

The Aetherius Society usually refers to King as "Dr. George King". The society does not, however, document where King received his doctorate. Barrett states that King received his doctorate from the "International Theological Seminary of California, a degree mill with no accreditation". King is also referred to as Metropolitan Archbishop of the Aetherius Churches. His consecration as a bishop was from the Theosophy-related Liberal Catholic Church.

In 1991 King was "presented Letters Patent of Armorial Bearings also known as a Grant of Arms, by Bluemantle Pursuivant, a Herald of Her Majesty's College of Arms in England." A Grant of Arms is applied for; anyone can receive a Grant of Arms if they can satisfy one of several requirements.

According to one source, King's "proper title" was "His Eminence Sir George King, O.S.P., Ph.D., Th.D., D.D., Metropolitan Archbishop of the Aetherius Churches." The knighthood is not British but from "an unspecified foreign source." American radio personality Long John Nebel had King as a guest on his show and later wrote: " 'George King of England' – is what he calls himself, and you can't be sure whether he's pausing after 'George,' or after 'King,' but it doesn't really matter because after about three minutes you get the idea strong and clear."

The society claims that King was a chaplain of the American Federation of Police. The organization's full name is "American Federation of Police and Concerned Citizens". Anyone who is a concerned citizen appears to be able to become a member for $45. Charity Navigator gives this organization its lowest ranking (0 stars). Several police organizations have warned that solicitations by the American Federation of Police are possible scams. The site does not appear to have any official way to apply for a position as a chaplain and does not provide any list of official chaplains.

According to skeptic James Randi, George King's titles of 'Reverend', 'Doctor' and 'Sir' are unverified.

Aetherius Society bibliography

Books
By George King:
The Nine Freedoms
The Twelve Blessing
Visit to the Logos of Earth
A Book of Sacred Prayers
The Practices of Aetherius
Jesus Comes Again
You Too Can Heal
Cosmic Voice - Volume I
Cosmic Voice - Volume II
Cosmic Voice Volume No. III
Cosmic Voice Volume No. IV
Cosmic Voice Volume No V
Cosmic Voice Volume No VI
Wisdom of the Planets
This is The Hour of Truth
Contact with a Lord of Karma
Become a Builder of the New Age
Operation Sunbeam - God's Magic in Action
The Five Temples of God
Join Your ship
You Are Responsible!
Karma and Reincarnation
Contact Your Higher Self through Yoga
The Importance of Commemoration - Spiritual Happiness
Realize Your Inner Potential (with Richard Lawrence)
Contacts with the Gods from Space (with Richard Lawrence)

By Richard Lawrence:
UFOs and the Extraterrestrial Message
Unlock Your Psychic Powers
Prayer Energy
The Magic of Healing
Gods, Guides and Guardian Angels
The King Who Came To Earth: A Biography (with Brian Keneipp)

Others:
The Holy Mountains of the World by Rev. Charles Abrahamson
Operation Earth Light by Brian C.Keneipp
Power Prayer by Chrissie Blaze and Gary Blaze
Workout for the Soul by Chrissie Blaze

Periodicals
Cosmic Voice
Aetherius Society Newsletter

See also
List of UFO organizations

References

External links
The Aetherius Society – official website of the movement
Page about the Aetherius Society at Religious Movements site   
 A scholarly article by John A. Saliba in the Marburg Journal of Religion: link to the article 
Aetherius Society: Jesus, Venusians, and some bad astronomy - Skeptical look at the society's astronomy claims
Aetherius Society: A lack of proof - Skeptical look at the society claims of King's pre-knowledge of certain historical events
Peakbagger.com (For a large map showing the locations of the Aetherius Society Holy Mountains)

UFO religions
New religious movements
Religious syncretism
1955 establishments in the United Kingdom
New Age organizations